V Coronae Australis (V CrA) is a R Coronae Borealis variable (RCB) star in the constellation Corona Australis. These are extremely hydrogen-deficient supergiants thought to have arisen as the result of the merger of two white dwarfs; fewer than 100 have been discovered as of 2012. V Coronae Australis dimmed in brightness from 1994 to 1998.

The visual apparent magnitude of V CrA has been observed to vary between magnitudes 9.4 and 17.9.  A maximum magnitude of 8.3 has been estimated from photographic plates.  It has around 60% the mass of the Sun and an effective (surface) temperature of around 6250 K.

The spectral class of R0 is typical of a carbon star, but the RCB stars are considered to a separate class of hydrogen-deficient stars, not normal asymptotic giant branch giants.

References

Corona Australis
R Coronae Borealis variables
Coronae Australis, V
Carbon stars
092207
173539
Durchmusterung objects